Akbar Ranjbarzadeh is an Iranian politician who is currently a member of the Parliament of Iran representing Asadabad district.

References

1965 births
Living people
People from Hamadan Province
Members of the 8th Islamic Consultative Assembly
Members of the 10th Islamic Consultative Assembly